Dolgopolov (masculine) or Dolgopolova (feminine) is a Russian last name. The following people share this last name:

 Alexandr Dolgopolov, formerly known as Oleksandr Dolgopolov Jr. (b. 1988), Ukrainian male tennis player.
 Astafy Dolgopolov (1725 – after 1797), Russian confidence trickster and impostor.
 Oleksandr Dolgopolov Sr. (b. 1964), Soviet and Ukrainian male tennis player.
 Vladimir Dolgopolov (1961–2016), Russian professional footballer.
 Sergey Dolgopolov (b. 1941), Latvian Russian politician.

Russian-language surnames